Someday Man is the debut studio album by Paul Williams, released in 1970. Notable songs from the album include "Someday Man", "Trust" and "To Put Up with You". The song "Someday Man", written by Paul Williams and Roger Nichols, was first released by The Monkees (and sung by Davy Jones) on their 1969 single "Listen to the Band / Someday Man". Chuck Kaye was credited for direction.

In 2018 the album was re-issued on vinyl by Ship To Shore Phono Co. The deluxe package included two bonus tracks plus new liner notes by Williams, Roger Nichols, and Richard Barone.

Track listing 
All music composed by Roger Nichols; all lyrics written by Paul Williams.

Side one 

 "Someday Man"
 "So Many People"
 "She's Too Good to Me"
 "Mornin' I'll Be Movin' On"
 "Time"

Side two 

 "Trust"
 "To Put Up with You"
 "Do You Really Have a Heart?" (arranged by Artie Butler)
 "I Know You"
 "Roan Pony"

Personnel
Paul Williams - vocals
Roger Nichols - guitar, bass, piano
Chad Stuart, David Cohen, Mike Deasy - guitar
Jack Conrad, Joe Osborne - bass
Larry Knechtel, Lincoln Mayorga - piano
Earl Palmer, Hal Blaine - drums
Artie Butler, Bob Thompson, Chad Stuart, Perry Botkin, Jr., Roger Nichols - arrangements
Technical
Barry Feinstein, Tom Wilkes - design, photography

References

1970 debut albums
Paul Williams (songwriter) albums
Reprise Records albums